Comeuppance (天有眼) is a 2000 Hong Kong comedy thriller film directed by Derek Chiu, with Jordan Chan and Patrick Tam.

References

External links

2000 films

Hong Kong comedy thriller films
2000s Hong Kong films